The Indonesian order of precedence is a nominal and symbolic hierarchy of important positions within the Government of Indonesia. It has legal standing and is used to dictate ceremonial protocol at events of a national nature.

Indonesian order of precedence 
Law No. 9 of 2010 on Protocol provides a separate Indonesian order of precedence at national level, provincial level, and municipal and regency level. Although came to force on 19 October 2010, the following lists precedence of offices and their holders .

National level

Provincial level

Municipal and regency level

References 

Politics of Indonesia
Government of Indonesia
Orders of precedence